The Volkswagen Type 276 Schlepperfahrzeug (tractor vehicle) was a derivative of the Type 82 Kübelwagen  modified to enable it to tow a load, gun or a trailer.

The intention was to use them in units composed of two modified Schlepperfahrzeug; one towing a 7.5 cm Infanteriegeschütz 37 infantry support gun, the other an ammunition trailer laden with 16 three-round cases of AP shell, and seven men (drivers included).  The Type 276 only appeared at the end of 1944 and never went into mass production.
.

Differences
Apart from having a standard Wehrmacht tow-hook fitted to the rear cross-body member, the Typ276 differed from the standard Typ82 on the following points: 

On the first model, the rear suspension was strengthened, and the car had bigger tyres (BF 200C16) on 7.00C16 rims (with a smaller offset inwards: 13 mm. instead of 33 mm).  These were the same tyres and rims fitted on the Typ 166 Schwimmwagen amphibious vehicle.

To prevent over-revving, especially when driving without a gun or trailer, the engine was fitted with a governor on the generator shaft (as fitted on the Typ155 stationary engine).

References

Notes

Bibliography 
 .

World War II vehicles of Germany
276 Schlepperfahrzeug
Goods manufactured in Germany
Rear-engined vehicles
Cars powered by boxer engines
Military light utility vehicles
Military vehicles of Germany